Born to Cry may refer to:

 "(I Was) Born to Cry", 1962 song by Dion DiMucci; see Dion DiMucci discography
 "Born to Cry", a song by the Swedish rock band The Hives on "Two-Timing Touch and Broken Bones"